Imogen Hare Duke King (born 1996) is an English actress. She is known for her roles in the second series of Clique (2018) on BBC Three, the ITV crime drama The Bay (2019–2021), the period drama Hotel Portofino (2022), and the Channel 4 crime drama Suspect (2022).

Early life
King is from Manchester. She joined local youth drama companies at The Lowry and the Royal Exchange, participating in the 2013 National Theatre Connections. She graduated with a Bachelor of Arts in Sociology from Goldsmiths, University of London in 2017. She enrolled in a Shakespearean programme at the Independent Centre for Actor Training in Bolton.

Filmography

Film

Television

Stage

References

External links
 
 Imogen King at Independent Talent

Living people
1996 births
Actresses from Manchester
Alumni of Goldsmiths, University of London